Said Durrah (born February 9, 1982) is an American stand-up comedian of Arab descent.

Early life
Durrah is of Jordanian and Palestinian descent. His father, Hisham Durrah, is from Amman, Jordan, and mother, Hiyam Durrah, is from Gaza, Palestine.

He was born in Detroit, Michigan, United States and he grew up in Mayo, Maryland, United States. He attended South River Senior and then studied General Business Administration at University of Maryland University College.

Career
Durrah worked in corporate marketing, travel agents and banking, before he focused entirely on comedy in 2009.

In October 2009, Durrah first hit the stage at Big Brown Comedy Hour in New York. He then got his start in Manhattan, New York, at Comic Strip Live. He then performed at the Town Hall Theatre on Broadway within his first year in comedy. Durrah has performed stand up comedy in a number of venues all over the United States.

In October and November 2010, he toured with other Muslim comedians on the "Arabs Gone Wild" tour. In 2011 and 2012, Durrah performed at the New York Arab American Comedy Festival at Gotham Comedy Club.

From February 2013, Durrah will be touring with his show "Arab Is Me".

Durrah also produces comedy shows.

Comedy style
Durrah's comedy career is influenced by his parents and their Arab roots. His comedy has been described as an experience of off the wall energy in which he uses different voices, storytelling, impersonations, and crazy facial expressions.

See also
Humour in Islam
Jordanian Americans
Palestinian Americans
List of Palestinian Americans

References

External links

Al-Din, Seif. Qs with Comedian Said Durrah. April 19, 2010
Durrah, Said. Broadway Theatre Review – Arab Edition. KABOBfest. October 4, 2010
Martinez, Michael. Arab-Americans watch Israel-Gaza conflict. CNN. 2012
Dodge, Carl. Said Durrah steps into the Recovery Room Podcast!. Blog Talk Radio''. April 11, 2012

1982 births
Living people
American Muslims
American people of Palestinian descent
American people of Jordanian descent
American male comedians
21st-century American comedians
American stand-up comedians
Muslim male comedians
People from Detroit
People from Bowie, Maryland
University of Maryland Global Campus alumni